Arthur Fata (born 1963) is a Zimbabwean sculptor.

Born in Salisbury (now Harare), Fata studied fine art at the Workshop School of the National Gallery of Zimbabwe.  Here he learned to use painting, printmaking, and textiles.  Unusually for a Zimbabwean artist, he later spent time studying in England, Portugal, and Bulgaria.  His work has drawn comparisons to that of Dominic Benhura, with whom he shares an interest in mixed media work.

References
Biographical sketch

1963 births
Living people
20th-century Zimbabwean sculptors
21st-century sculptors